Difendo il mio amore is a 1956 Italian  film. It stars actor Gabriele Ferzetti.

Plot 
As part of a story, a reporter goes to meet Elisa, a young woman he met a few years ago on a trial on which she was finally exonerated.

Cast
Gabriele Ferzetti: Pietro
Martine Carol: Elsa
Vittorio Gassman: Giovanni
Arnoldo Foà: avvocato
Charles Vanel: Verdisio
Giorgia Moll: Orietta
Leonardo Bragaglia
Alan Furlan
Elena Altieri 
Mino Doro 
Clelia Matania 
Loris Gizzi
Enrico Glori
Antonella Della Porta  
Renato Chiantoni

References

External links

1956 films
Italian drama films
1950s Italian-language films
Films scored by Renzo Rossellini
1950s Italian films
Italian black-and-white films
1956 drama films